Delfine Bafort (born 22 May 1979) is a Belgian fashion model and actress.

Biography
Delfine Bafort completed her secondary studies in Free Visual Arts at the Sint-Lucas College in Ghent. At 17 she won a modeling contest, which led to an international modeling career. Since then she has modeled in big fashion shows and was the face of exclusive brands such as Balenciaga, Versace, Dolce & Gabbana, Jean Paul Gaultier, Loewe, Cacharel, Calvin Klein, Moschino, and DKNY. She was on the cover of international magazines such as Vogue, Harper's Bazaar, Marie Claire, Elle and Dazed & Confused.

In 2003 she played the lead female in the cult film Steve + Sky by Felix Van Groeningen, her former boyfriend. In 2005 she passed admissions for the drama program at the Royal Conservatory of Ghent. She also appeared in Old Times by Harold Pinter, along with Gabriel Ríos and Leen Verheyen, which was directed by Mieja Hollevoet.

In 2008 she starred alongside Vincent Gallo in his movie Promises Written in Water, which premiered in September 2010 at the 67th Venice Film Festival and competed for the Golden Lion (Leone d'Oro).

Filmography

External links 
 
 Delfine Bafort on Models.com
 Delfine Bafort in the Fashion Model Directory

References

Belgian actresses
Belgian female models
1979 births
Living people